Vancouver South is a federal electoral district in British Columbia, Canada, that has been represented in the House of Commons of Canada from 1917 to 1997, and since 2004. It covers the southern portion of the city of Vancouver, British Columbia.

Demographics
The riding is one of the most diverse in Canada, with less than one-fifth of the population being of European descent. As of 2021, four pan-ethnic groups form greater than 10 percent of the riding; 38.1% East Asian, 18.7% European, 17.8% South Asian and 16% Southeast Asian.

Vancouver South is the centre of the city's South Asian community; the colourful Punjabi Market (Little India) and the close-knit community of religious Sikhs dominate the area. The service sector, retail trade and manufacturing are the major sources of employment in Vancouver South. Nearly 30% of residents over the age of 25 years have obtained a university certificate or degree. The average family income is over $71,000. Unemployment is around 6.3%.

History
This electoral district was formed in 1914 from Vancouver City riding.

In 1996, it was abolished and used to create Vancouver South—Burnaby with portions of New Westminster—Burnaby.

Vancouver South was re-created in 2003 when the Burnaby sections were moved into the new ridings Burnaby—Douglas and Burnaby—New Westminster.

The 2012 federal electoral boundaries redistribution concluded that the electoral boundaries of Vancouver South should be adjusted, and a modified electoral district of the same name will be contested in future elections. The redefined Vancouver South loses a portion of its current territory west of Cambie Street to the new district of Vancouver Granville, and gains a small area in the northeast currently included in Vancouver Kingsway. These new boundaries were legally defined in the 2013 representation order, which came into effect upon the call of the 42nd Canadian federal election, scheduled for October 2015.

Members of Parliament

This riding has elected the following Members of Parliament:

Election results

Vancouver South, 2004–present
Its current representing MP is Harjit Sajjan, who is Minister of International Development in the current federal Cabinet. He has been its MP since the 2015 federal election, when he beat the Conservative then-incumbent by more than 6,000 votes.

Vancouver South, 1917–1997

See also
 List of Canadian federal electoral districts
 Past Canadian electoral districts

References

Notes

External links
 Library of Parliament Riding Profile 1914-1996
 Library of Parliament Riding Profile 1996-present
 Expenditures - 2004
 Website of the Parliament of Canada

Politics of Vancouver
British Columbia federal electoral districts
Federal electoral districts in Greater Vancouver and the Fraser Valley